Rosie Trevelyan is a British biologist, and director of the Cambridge office of the Tropical Biology Association. She won the 2008 Silver Medal of the Zoological Society of London.

Life
She earned a BA and DPhil. from Oxford University. 
She was co-founder of the Cambridge Conservation Forum.
She lectures in the Department of Zoology, University of Cambridge.

References

External links
University of Cambridge > Talks.cam > Dr. Rosie Trevelyan

21st-century British biologists
21st-century British women scientists
Academics of the University of Cambridge
Alumni of the University of Oxford
British women biologists
Living people
Year of birth missing (living people)
Place of birth missing (living people)
21st-century British zoologists
Women zoologists